Upper Castra is a semi-rural locality in the local government area (LGA) of Central Coast in the North-west and west LGA region of Tasmania. The 2016 census has a population of 77 for the state suburb of Upper Castra.

Etymology
The word castra is meant as "camp" in this context, and Upper Castra is so named because it is further inland from Castra.

History 
Upper Castra was gazetted as a locality in 1965.

Castra Road Upper Post Office opened on 1 June 1890 and closed in 1974.

Geography
Upper Castra is connected to the Coast by Castra Road (State Route B15), which goes through the villages of Sprent, Spalford, Abbotsham and connects to Main Road in Ulverstone.  It is bounded on the east by the Wilmot River (see Wilmot Power Station), to the south by Nietta and to the west by Preston and South Preston.

Education
Historically, the local school was an important focus of the community.

The two nearest current primary schools are at Sprent and Wilmot and the nearest high school is Ulverstone High School.  The Don College is the closest public college.

References

Localities of Central Coast Council (Tasmania)
Towns in Tasmania